Rhinosardinia is a small genus of sprats restricted to the rivers of South America.  There are currently only two described species in the genus.

Species
 Rhinosardinia amazonica (Steindachner, 1879) (Amazon spinejaw sprat)
 Rhinosardinia bahiensis (Steindachner, 1879) (Bahia sprat)

References
 

Clupeidae
Fish of South America
Freshwater fish genera
Taxa named by Carl H. Eigenmann